Yan Yuan (1635 - 1704), courtesy name Yizhi or Hunran, art name Xizhai founded the practical school of Confucianism to contrast with the more ethereal Neo-Confucianism that had been popular in China for the previous six centuries.  Like the Han learning scholars, he rejected the abstract metaphysics of the Neo-Confucians.  However, he considered Han learning as too obsessed with philology and textual criticism and not enough emphasis on pragmatism.  His school promoted the Six Arts.

He was born on April 27, 1635, in the Zhili province (now called Hebei) in China and spent his youth in poverty, after his father was taken into the Qing army and never returned. He died on September 30, 1704, in the same province.

The ideas of Yan Yuan were developed by his disciple Li Gong :zh:李塨 (Yan-Li school). 

Yan's intellectual heritage was addressed by Wu Han in the 20th century. Wu elaborated on the Yan's concept of the relation between history and the present.

See also
 Silhak

References
Article from Encyclopædia Britannica

Bibliography
 Chan, Wing-tsit (trans.), 1963, A Source Book in Chinese Philosophy, Princeton, NJ: Princeton University Press.
 

1704 deaths
1635 births
Chinese Confucianists
Writers from Baoding
Philosophers from Hebei
Qing dynasty essayists
Qing dynasty philosophers
17th-century Chinese philosophers
Qing dynasty classicists